Allchin is a surname which may refer to: 

Bridget Allchin (1927–2017), British archaeologist
Donald Allchin (1930–2010), British Anglican priest and theologian
Jim Allchin (born 1951), American blues rock guitarist, computer scientist, and philanthropist
Raymond Allchin (1923–2010), British archaeologist
Sir William Allchin (1846–1912), English physician and lecturer

See also
Alchin